"Obsession" is a song by South Korean–Chinese boy band Exo, released on November 27, 2019, as the lead single of their sixth studio album Obsession. The music video was released on the same date.

Background and composition 
Written by Kenzie, and produced by Dem Jointz, "Obsession" is described as a hip-hop dance track featuring repeating spell-like vocal samples over a heavy beat, as well as an addictive R&B infused chorus. The lyrics convey a straightforward monologue of ones willingness to escape from the darkness of an awful obsession.

Music video 

On August 12, 2020, the music video surpassed 100 million views on YouTube, becoming their eleventh to do so.

Promotion
Exo promoted the album and song with teasers throughout November 2019, including a minute-long EXODEUX concept trailer, which showcases the member's "X-Exo" alter-ego's, as well as a music video teaser which was released 6 hours before the music video.

Charts

Weekly charts

Monthly charts

Year-end charts

Sales

Accolades

References 

2019 singles
2019 songs
Exo songs
Korean-language songs
SM Entertainment singles